Vitali Sergeyevich Bezrukov (born 1 January 1942 in Gorky Oblast), is a Soviet and Russian actor and theatre director.

He has made appearances with his son, Sergei Bezrukov, in two TV miniseries, Brigada (2002) and Yesenin (2005), as well as in the 2002 production of the play Aleksandr Pushkin, which Vitali directed, at the Yermolova Theatre.

Biography
After graduating from high school in the city of Gorky he enrolled in drama school Sverdlovsk theater.
He graduated in 1966, Moscow Art Theatre School with honors.
As a student of IV-th year has played a major role in the play named after Mayakovsky Theatre "Oedipus Rex".
He worked at the Moscow Art Theater, from 1969 he worked in Moscow Pushkin Drama Theatre. In the television film-opera "Anna Snegina" played poet Sergei Yesenin.
From 1980 he worked in the Satire Theater.

External links
 

1942 births
Living people
People from Vachsky District
Russian male television actors
Soviet male stage actors
Russian male stage actors
20th-century Russian male actors
21st-century Russian male actors
Soviet screenwriters
20th-century Russian screenwriters
Male screenwriters
20th-century Russian male writers
Soviet theatre directors
Moscow Art Theatre School alumni
Russian theatre directors